Sergio Ramón "El Checho" Ibarra (born January 11, 1973) is a retired Argentine footballer who played as a striker.

Career 
Although born in Argentina, Ibarra has played during almost all of his career in Peru, where he first moved at age 19 to join the ranks of Ciclista Lima in the first division, in 1992.

His biggest claim to fame was in 2004 when he won the Recopa against Boca Juniors as part of Cienciano. That same year the Argentine football magazine El Gráfico declared that he was the Argentine player who had scored the most goals worldwide (21), one more than Carlos Tevez, Andrés Silvera, and Luis Bonnet, and two more than Javier Saviola.

On March 2, 2008 Ibarra broke the all-time scoring record in the Peruvian league, netting his 193rd goal in a 1-0 win over Cienciano. He is the Peruvian League Top Scorer with 226 goals.

Playing style
Ibarra is famous for scoring many goals despite having what many consider as very limited technical abilities. He is very often the top scorer of his team.

Personal 
He is nicknamed "Checho", "Manteca" and/or "Shevchecho" after the famous Ukrainian footballer Andriy Shevchenko. He has obtained Peruvian nationality.

Honours

Club
Cienciano
Recopa Sudamericana: 2004
Torneo Apertura: 2005

References

External links

1973 births
Living people
People from Río Cuarto, Córdoba
Argentine emigrants to Peru
Naturalized citizens of Peru
Association football forwards
Argentine footballers
Peruvian footballers
Peruvian Primera División players
Categoría Primera A players
Ciclista Lima Association footballers
Alianza Atlético footballers
Deportivo Municipal footballers
Sport Boys footballers
Club Deportivo Wanka footballers
C.D. Águila footballers
Club Universitario de Deportes footballers
Unión Huaral footballers
Estudiantes de Medicina footballers
Cienciano footballers
Once Caldas footballers
José Gálvez FBC footballers
FBC Melgar footballers
Juan Aurich footballers
Sport Huancayo footballers
Peruvian expatriate footballers
Expatriate footballers in Peru
Expatriate footballers in El Salvador
Expatriate footballers in Colombia
Peruvian Primera División managers
Cienciano managers
Argentine football managers
Sportspeople from Córdoba Province, Argentina